Johanne Martel-Pelletier (born April 20, 1952) is a Canadian pharmacologist living and working in Quebec. She studies the pathophysiology and molecular mechanisms of arthritis.

She was born in Saint-Jean-sur-Richelieu. She earned a master's degree and doctorate in physiology from the University of Montreal. She continued with post-graduate studies in biophysics at the University of Montreal and in rheumatology at the University of Miami. In 1981, she was named assistant professor of medicine at the University of Montreal; in 1995, she became a full professor.

In 1981, she co-founded the Osteoarthritis Research Unit at the Hôpital Notre-Dame of the Centre hospitalier de l'Université de Montréal and has served as that unit's co-director.

She has also been awarded a number of prizes including the International League of Associations of Rheumatology Prize, the Carol-Nachman Prize for Rheumatology and the European League Against Rheumatism Scientific Award for Basic Research in Osteoarthritis.

References 

1952 births
Living people
Canadian pharmacologists
French Quebecers
People from Saint-Jean-sur-Richelieu
Université de Montréal alumni
University of Miami alumni
Academic staff of the Université de Montréal